Sanden may refer to:

Business
 Sanden Corporation, a Japanese heating and cooling company (automotive and commercial)

Places
 Sanden, Indonesia, a subdistrict in Bantul Regency, Special Region of Yogyakarta, Indonesia
 Sanden, Nordland, a village in Hadsel municipality, Nordland county, Norway
 Sanden, Mandal, an area in the town of Mandal, Vest-Agder county, Norway

People
 Frida Sandén (born 1994), a Swedish singer
 John Howard Sanden (1935-2022), an American portrait artist 
 Mimmi Sandén (born 1995), a Swedish singer
 Molly Sandén (born 1992), a Swedish singer
 Shanice van de Sanden (born 1992), a Dutch football striker